Bangor Bridge (also known as the Bangor-on-Dee Bridge) is a Grade I listed bridge crossing the River Dee in Bangor-on-Dee, Wrexham County Borough, Wales. It is situated on the community boundary between Bangor-is-y-Coed and Sesswick. Located to the west of Bangor-on-Dee, it connects the village's high street and the A525 road bypass. The narrow bridge is a one-way traffic bridge, west to east, and is downstream (north) of the Bangor by-pass bridge.

Description 
The bridge crosses the River Dee, which currently serves as the boundary between the communities of Bangor-is-y-Coed and Sesswick within Wrexham County Borough since 1996. The River Dee at this location, historically served as the boundary between the historic county of Denbighshire to the west and Flintshire's Maelor Saesneg containing Bangor-on-Dee to the east.

The bridge is listed by Cadw, and described to have a group value with the nearby listed buildings of Bangor-on-Dee war memorial and the Church of St Dunawd.

The cambered bridge's five unequal elliptical stepped arches are mainly made of red sandstone, with some coursed rubble and finely dressed stone. The parapets and full height splayed cutwaters are made of yellow sandstone with refuges on the top.

Inigo Jones is speculated to be the bridge's architect, with similar bridges constructed in places such as Llanrwst (Pont Fawr) and Llangollen attributed to him.

A scheduled monument is also on the site, consisting of a medieval or post-medieval remains of an older bridge.

History 
The earliest reports of a bridge at or near this location in historical maps date to 1036, whereas the earliest mention of a medieval wooden design bridge at this location was recorded in 1292.

The current bridge is of medieval late 15th or early 16th century origins but the current structure mainly dates to the 17th century, with a notable restoration in 1658, by Inigo Jones.

The bridge was repaired several times over its lifespan, including a  repair in 1757 caused by frequent flooding. There was another repair costing  in 1843.

It was recorded by the Royal Commission on the Ancient and Historical Monuments of Wales in 1910. The bridge connects to the village's high street.

Prior to the 1900's the bridge was mainly used by horse-drawn vehicles, farm carts and pedestrians. When motor vehicle usage on the bridge increased, it damaged the bridge, leading to the introduction of traffic lights and weight restrictions on the bridge to limit the damage. In 1970, there was a petition to construct a new bridge and by-pass in the village, with the bridge and by-pass completed in 1978 and is located south (upstream) of the medieval bridge. The Bangor-on-Dee bridge was reduced to only one-way traffic from the west, when the A525 by-pass opened.

See also 
 List of bridges in Wales

References 

Bridges across the River Dee, Wales
Road bridges in Wales
Bridges in Wrexham County Borough
Grade I listed bridges in Wales
Grade I listed buildings in Wrexham County Borough